Romulo Royo is a contemporary artist, born in 1976 in Zaragoza, Spain.

He produced paintings, books, sculptures, photographs, drawings and video installations. His works have a connection with fetishism, sado and fantasy genre. He brings us the current science fiction theme to the world of painting. He is driven by universes that transport us to other worlds and timeless spaces out of everyday reality to dive into the most enigmatic places, the structure of his painting is primary and resounding.

Biography

After studying at the School of Arts and Graphic Design and Illustration, and also later History at the Faculty of Philosophy that he left to make an artistic group, Group 3, based on performances and releases with dadaist theme. His early influences come from H.R. Giger, Anselm Kiefer or Jodorowsky.

In the beginning, from 1995 to 1999 he makes illustrations for Norma Editorial. His work is published internationally in form of covers for novels and comic books of publishers Eura Editoriale (Italy), Rad Moskbay (Russia), Bastei (Germany).

In 2000 Romulo Royo began his career in painting, exhibiting his work in museums such as Pablo Serrano Museum, Provincial Museum of Huesca and Provincial Museum of Teruel. Exhibits at the Meta Project that has a large circuit through Valencia (Spain), A Coruña (Spain) Verona, Milan (Italy), Frankfurt (Germany) and Tokyo (Japan). His works began to be published in various magazines and newspapers.

From this moment his work is exhibited in major private galleries, foundations, museums and international exhibitions, as Art Forum Berlin, FIAC ("Foire internationale d'art contemporain"), Art Basel Miami, Los Angeles Art Show and ARCO Madrid among others.

Performs some of his best-known series like Siamese, Blackened Times or Metal-Piel formed by paintings, sculptures, installations and technological medium. Which are exposed in the Metelkova Museum, Can Framis Museum, XXV Biennale of Alexandria at the Museum of Alexandria, the Maeztu Museum of Estella, The 4th Biennial of Contemporary Art in Moscow, Metelkova National Museum of Slovenia, Centre d'Art Santa Monica …

The joint work of Romulo Royo with Luis Royo has its origins back in 1994 when they work together in the Malefic universe. In the following years their works part away, they develop their activity independently in different studies and cities. In 2006 he collaborated with Luis Royo and undertook a trip to Moscow, where their art would be captured on dome Medvedev of 24 meters in diameter. The whole process of this work is published in the book Dome.

In 2008 he worked once again with Luis Royo for large format paintings that were collected in the book Dead Moon, which comes later in 2010 published in a book entitled "the day will come" in Spectrum XVIII, The Best in Contemporary Fantastic Art. Their collaboration was solidified and the rest of the creations as Demons and especially the complex multimedia project Malefic Time is performed said by said.

They treat an apocalyptic world where a civilization decimated in inhabitants, decrepit and crumbling, struggle to survive through the confrontation of Annunakis to fight in a final battle. At the heart of this deadly scenario: Luz, her sword Malefic and her many questions are the protagonist of the story.

The project brings several books with paintings, illustrations and scripts of international circulation, the book Malefic Time, Apocalypse is presented in the Barcelona Comic Fair published by Norma Editorial. Later the book will also be edited by Bragelonne (France), Rizzoli Lizard (Italy), Cross Cult (Germany) ... and presented in other fairs like the Frankfurt Book Fair and the Guadalajara International Book Fair.

Other formats that the project reaches to are the Apocalypse Codex novel written by Jesus Vilches, manga Soum by Kenny Ruiz and the rock band Avalanch that composed an album of characters and sequences of the universe Malefic Time. Together they have performed international tours and live painting performances. Other products have been launched to the world marked focusing on his art and other merchandising products such as calendars, sculptures and tarot cards.

Life and career
From a very early age he is captivated by painting, cinema and comic. His first influences are found in H. R. Giger, Anselm Kiefer or Jodorowsky. It grows with films like Alien, Blade Runner of Ridley Scott, or the first trilogy of Star Wars of George Lucas or the Drum of Tin. But from watching the movie New York Stories composed of three short stories, specifically with Life Lessons directed by Martin Scorsese and written by Richard Price, at the moment knew that what he wanted was to be a painter.

He studied in the School of Arts, Graphic Design and Illustration and later History in the Faculty of Philosophy that leaves to create an artistic group, called Group 3, along with Raul Navarro and Yago de Mateo, based on Dadaist performances and communiques. At the same time, he produces illustrations and orders for the editorial standards that are published internationally as covers of the series John Sinclair, Maddrax, Vampira (Germany) or Lanciostory and Skorpio (Italy).

References

 Biography, Miguel Marcos Gallery Consulted 23 October 2015 
 Great Aragonese Encyclopedia, Artistic Groups Consulted 23 October 2015 
 Exclusive Interview Consulted 23 October 2015 
 XVIII Manga Fair in Barcelona Consulted 23 October 2015 
 Heraldo de Aragon, Culture - Newspaper Article Consulted 23 October 2015 
 Laberinto Gris(Profile and Category of the artist in a Gallery).

Artists from Aragon
Painters from Aragon
1976 births
Living people